Brat is an Australian band fronted by Natalie Miller from Young Talent Time. The band formed in 2002 with Miller (vocals), Cameron McGlinchey (drums), Alex Lange (guitar) and Matt Cornell (bass). They released "He Said She Said" in July 2003. The song, written by Miller, Simon Austin (Frente) and Barry Palmer, debuted at number 77 on the ARIA Single chart. In February 2004 they had a listening party for their debut album but the album was not released.

Discography
singles
"He Said She Said" (2003) - MGM Aus #77

References

Australian rock music groups
Musical groups established in 2002
Musical groups disestablished in 2004
2002 establishments in Australia